Hamur District is a district of Ağrı Province of Turkey. Its seat is the town Hamur. Its area is 873 km2, and its population is 17,106 (2021).

Composition
There is one municipality in Hamur District:
 Hamur

There are 46 villages in Hamur District:

 Abdiçıkmaz
 Adımova
 Akyurt
 Alakoyun
 Aşağıaladağ
 Aşağıderedibi
 Aşağıgözlüce
 Aşağıkarabal
 Aşağıyenigün
 Ayvacık
 Baldere
 Beklemez
 Ceylanlı
 Çağlayan
 Danakıran
 Demirkapı
 Ekincik
 Erdoğan
 Esenören
 Gültepe
 Gümüşkuşak
 Kaçmaz
 Kamışlı
 Kandildağı
 Karadoğu
 Karakazan
 Karaseyitali
 Karlıca
 Kaynaklı
 Kılıç
 Köşkköy
 Nallıkonak
 Özdirek
 Sarıbuğday
 Seslidoğan
 Seyithanbey
 Soğanlıtepe
 Süleymankümbet
 Tükenmez
 Uğurtaş
 Yapılı
 Yoğunhisar
 Yukarıaladağ
 Yukarıgözlüce
 Yukarıyenigün
 Yuvacık

References

Districts of Ağrı Province